John Timothy Griffin (born August 21, 1968) is an American lawyer and politician serving as the 57th attorney general of Arkansas. He previously served as the 20th lieutenant governor of Arkansas, from 2015 to 2023. Griffin defeated Democrat John Burkhalter for lieutenant governor in 2014 and served under Governor Asa Hutchinson. In summer 2020, Griffin announced his candidacy for the 2022 Arkansas gubernatorial election, but withdrew from the race in February 2021 to run for Arkansas Attorney General instead.

Early life and education
Griffin was born in Charlotte, North Carolina, and reared in Magnolia in Columbia County in southern Arkansas. He graduated from Hendrix College in Conway, Arkansas, and in 1994 from Tulane Law School in New Orleans, Louisiana.

Early political career

Prior to 2004
Griffin worked from September 1995 to January 1997 with Special Prosecutor David Barrett in the investigation of former Secretary of Housing and Urban Development, Henry Cisneros. For two years after that he was the Senior Investigative Counsel for the House Committee on Government Reform.

In September 1999, he became Deputy Research Director for the Republican National Committee (for George W. Bush's election campaign); while in that position, he was a legal advisor for the "Bush-Cheney 2000 Florida Recount Team" (see Bush v. Gore). From March 2001 through June 2002 he was a special assistant to the Assistant Attorney General Michael Chertoff.

2004 presidential election

From June 2002 to December 2004, Griffin was Research Director and Deputy Communications Director for Bush's 2004 reelection campaign, a high-ranking position within the RNC.

In June 2007, Senators Edward Kennedy of Massachusetts and Sheldon Whitehouse of Rhode Island asked the U.S. Justice Department to investigate whether Griffin led an RNC effort to suppress the African-American vote in Jacksonville, Florida, through caging during the 2004 election. Griffin called the allegations of voter suppression "absolutely, positively false" and there was no finding of any wrongdoing.

White House (2005–2006)
In April 2005, Griffin began working at the White House as Karl Rove's aide, with the title of Special Assistant to the President and Deputy Director in the Office of Political Affairs.

U.S. Attorney (2006–2007)

In September 2006, after ending a one-year military mobilization assignment, Griffin began working as a special assistant to U.S. Attorney Bud Cummins in the Eastern District of Arkansas.

On December 15, 2006, the Justice Department announced that Griffin would be appointed interim U.S. Attorney for the Eastern District of Arkansas, effective December 20, 2006, the date when the resignation of Cummins took effect.

Before a March 2006 revision to the PATRIOT Act, interim U.S. Attorneys had a 120-day term limit, pending confirmation by the Senate of a presidential nominee. The Attorney General makes interim appointments; after the revision, the Attorney General's interim appointees had no term limit, effectively bypassing the Senate confirmation process if the President declined to put forward a nomination. Griffin was among the first group of interim attorneys appointed by the Attorney General without a term limit. Gonzales's decision to bypass confirmation for Griffin particularly angered Arkansas's then Democratic senators, Blanche Lincoln and Mark Pryor, who both stated that Gonzales promised them Griffin would go before the Senate for confirmation. Gonzales's decision not to do so prompted Lincoln and Pryor to join many of their Democratic colleagues to demand Gonzales's resignation or firing.

On May 30, 2007, Griffin resigned from his position effective June 1, 2007 with a tearful speech declaring that public service "not worth it. I'm married now and have a kid. I'm sorry I put my wife through this and I'm trying to move on."

Documents released by a subsequent congressional investigation showed that, in the summer of 2006, White House officials wanted a vacant slot in the U.S. Attorney's office in Little Rock so that Griffin could fill it. Prior to this, he was a top Republican researcher and aide to Rove. On February 16, 2007, ten days after McNulty testified that Cummins was dismissed and resigned under duress to create a vacancy for Griffin's appointment, Griffin announced he would not seek the presidential nomination to be U.S. attorney in Little Rock.

In September 2008, the Office of the Inspector General in the Department of Justice issued a report concluding that Cummins had not been removed for any reasons related to his performance, but rather to make a place for Griffin.

On August 11, 2009, The New York Times reported that previously classified White House emails showed that Karl Rove had lobbied for Griffin to be appointed Cummins's successor.

2008 presidential election

On May 31, 2007, The Washington Post reported speculation that Griffin was in discussions with the then-nascent presidential campaign of Fred Thompson for a top-level post. Instead, Griffin set up  an office in Little Rock for Mercury Public Affairs, a New York City-based firm, part of the Omnicom Group, at which Griffin had worked as general counsel and managing director. (The Thompson campaign paid Mercury Public Affairs to have Griffin as an advisor.) Then, after a short period with Mercury, he started Griffin Public Affairs and the Griffin Law Firm.

In late May 2008, columnist Robert Novak reported that Griffin had been named as the RNC's director of research for the presidential campaign of Senator John McCain of Arizona. Griffin was assigned to direct opposition research, "although final arrangements have not been pinned down," Novak said. But Griffin said he was not going back to the Republican National Committee (RNC), and that he had not talked to anyone in the GOP's leadership structure or with the McCain campaign about that role.

U.S. House of Representatives

Elections
2010

On September 21, 2009, Griffin announced that he was running for Congress, to replace Democrat Vic Snyder who stepped down after fourteen years in Arkansas' 2nd congressional district. He defeated the Democratic nominee Joyce Elliott, then the outgoing  Majority Leader of the Arkansas Senate.  Elliott's campaign highlighted Griffin's past controversies such as the Bush campaign's voter caging efforts and his being named one of the "Crooked Candidates of 2010" by the left-wing Citizens for Responsibility and Ethics in Washington.

Griffin won with 58% of the vote.

2012

Griffin won re-election with 55% of the vote, over former state representative Herb C. Rule III.

Tenure
In 2009, Griffin signed a pledge sponsored by Americans for Prosperity promising to vote against any Global warming legislation that would raise taxes.

Legislation sponsored
 Authority for Mandate Delay Act (H.R. 2667; 113th Congress) – Rep. Griffin introduced this bill on July 11, 2013 in response to a July 2, 2013 announcement from the Obama Administration that they would be delaying one of the key requirements of the Patient Protection and Affordable Care Act (commonly known as "Obamacare"). Their decision was that the requirement that all companies which employed more than 50 workers must offer an employee health insurance plan or pay a fine, scheduled to begin January 1, 2014, would now be delayed until 2015. This decision was immediately criticized for exceeding executive authority.

In response to the Obama Administration's decision, then House Majority Leader Eric Cantor announced that Congress would need to approve any delay. When he explained why he had introduced the bill, Griffin argued that, although he believed the Obama Administration's unilateral decision to delay the mandate was illegal, he still believed delaying the mandate was a good way to save jobs and protect workers.
 Griffin, along with Rep. Ander Crenshaw and Rep. Candice Miller, introduced the Save Our Military Shopping Benefits Act in 2014. The bill would prohibit the military from closing or cutting commissary stores and exchanges on bases in the United States.

Committee assignments
Griffin served on the following committees and subcommittees:
 Committee on Ways and Means
 Subcommittee on Human Resources
 Subcommittee on Social Security
 Republican Study Committee
On January 16, 2014, House Ways and Means Subcommittee on Social Security held a hearing with the head of Social Security and the Social Security inspector general. During the hearing, Griffin challenged statistics presented by Carolyn Colvin, the acting commissioner of the Social Security Administration. In her testimony, Colvin said that 99 percent of Social Security disability payments are correctly made without fraud.

Lieutenant Governor

2014 election

Griffin was the Republican nominee for Lieutenant Governor of Arkansas in the 2014 elections. He defeated two Republican challengers in the primary election, both outgoing members of the Arkansas House of Representatives, Andy Mayberry and Debra Hobbs, taking 63 percent of the vote to Mayberry's 21 percent and Hobbs' 16 percent.

In the general election on November 4, 2014, Griffin defeated Democrat John Burkhalter in the lieutenant governor's race.

2018 election

Griffin won re-election in the 2018 general election.

Personal life
Griffin attended Immanuel Baptist Church, a Southern Baptist congregation in Little Rock.

Electoral history

References

External links

 Attorney General Tim Griffin official government site
 
 
 

|-

|-

|-

|-

 
|-

 

1968 births
21st-century American politicians
Alumni of Pembroke College, Oxford
Arkansas Attorneys General
Arkansas lawyers
Baptists from Arkansas
Dismissal of U.S. attorneys controversy
George W. Bush administration personnel
Hendrix College alumni
Lieutenant Governors of Arkansas
Living people
Magnolia High School (Arkansas) alumni
People from Charlotte, North Carolina
Politicians from Little Rock, Arkansas
Republican Party members of the United States House of Representatives from Arkansas
Tulane University Law School alumni
United States Army colonels
United States Army personnel of the Iraq War
United States Army reservists
United States Army War College alumni
United States Attorneys for the Eastern District of Arkansas